The Gaza Crisis may relate to the following events:

Battle of Gaza (2007)
Gaza War (2008-2009)
2012 Gaza fuel crisis
2014 Israel–Gaza conflict

Gaza Strip